The Antarctic armless flounder (Mancopsetta maculata) is a species of southern flounder found on subantarctic shelves, around Antarctic islands, and banks off East Antarctica. This species can grow to a length of  SL.

References

 

Achiropsettidae
Fish described in 1880
Taxa named by Albert Günther